The Tofanellidae is a taxonomic family of sea snails, marine gastropod mollusks in the informal group Lower Heterobranchia.

Subfamilies 
The family Tofanellidae used to consist of the two following subfamilies (according to the taxonomy of the Gastropoda by Bouchet & Rocroi, 2005):
 Tofanellinae Bandel, 1995
 Usedomellinae Gründel, 1998

Genera 
Genera within the family Tofanellidae include:
 Atomiscala de Boury, 1909
 Bouryiscala Cossmann, 1902
 Coenaculum Iredale, 1924
 Graphis Jeffreys, 1867
 † Tofanella Bandel, 1995 - type genus of the family Tofanellidae, from the late Triassic
 † Usedomella Gründel, 1998 - type genus of the subfamily Usedomellinae
 Usedomella laevigatoidea (Gründel, 1993) - from the mid Jurassic
 Usedomella lata 
 Usedomella magnoconcha 
 Usedomella schroederi Gründel, 1998 - from the Early Jurassic
 Usedomella winkleri 
Genera brought into synonymy
 Cioniscus Jeffreys, 1869: synonym of Graphis Jeffreys, 1867
 Dissopalia Iredale, 1936: synonym of Bouryiscala Cossmann, 1902
  † Rotfanella Gründel, 1998: synonym of Graphis Jeffreys, 1867

Bandel (2005) recognized the genus Graphis Jeffreys, 1867 as a living fossil within the subfamily Usedomellinae.

References